Linden Hall (born 20 June 1991) is an Australian track and field middle-distance runner.

Early years 
Hall started running while in primary school in Victoria. While still in Grade 6, she came 11th in her first national championships in cross country. She also played netball and was a strong swimmer. However, she gave these away when she joined Essendon Athletics club and commenced regular athletics training with a coach.  

After high school, from 2011 to 2015, Hall went to the US where she studied Dietetics at Florida State University. During her college athletics career, she ran in three National Collegiate Athletic Association (NCAA) 1500m finals and won bronze in 2014.

Achievements 
Hall represented Australia in the 1500 metres at the 2016 Summer Olympics. She came 4th in her heat to qualify for the semifinal. In the semifinal she finished in 8th and did not advance to the final.

At the 2020 Tokyo Olympics Hall came third in both her heat and semi-final of the Women's 1500m, each time improving her time. She thus made the final of the 1500m, where she finished in 6th position, with a personal best time of 3:59.01.

Personal bests

International competitions

References

1991 births
Living people
Athletes from Melbourne
Sportswomen from Victoria (Australia)
Australian female middle-distance runners
Olympic athletes of Australia
Athletes (track and field) at the 2016 Summer Olympics
Athletes (track and field) at the 2020 Summer Olympics
Athletes (track and field) at the 2018 Commonwealth Games
World Athletics Championships athletes for Australia
Florida State Seminoles women's track and field athletes
Monash University alumni
Australian expatriate sportspeople in the United States
Commonwealth Games competitors for Australia
People from Sunbury, Victoria